Jenny Sjöwall (born 17 August 1971) is a Swedish archer. She competed at the 1988 Summer Olympics, the 1992 Summer Olympics and the 1996 Summer Olympics.

References

External links
 

1971 births
Living people
Swedish female archers
Olympic archers of Sweden
Archers at the 1988 Summer Olympics
Archers at the 1992 Summer Olympics
Archers at the 1996 Summer Olympics
Sportspeople from Karlstad
20th-century Swedish women